Prismatic describes the properties of an optical prism.

Prismatic may also refer to:
Prismatic (app), a social news curation and discovery app
Prismatic joint, a joint that provides a linear sliding movement between two bodies
Prismatic surface
The Prismatic World Tour, concert tour by singer Katy Perry